Bayer is a surname with various origins. It occurs most commonly in German-speaking countries, where it can be either habitational (Bayer being the male German language demonym for Bavaria) or occupational (derived from the archaic German verb beiern, "to ring (a bell)", thus referring to individuals tasked with ringing church bells). Variants of the surname include Baier, Beyer and Beier.

In the English-speaking world, the surname comes from the ancient kingdom of Bernicia, in what is now southeastern Scotland and North East England. It is derived from the place name Byers, which in turn comes from the Old English byre, meaning cattle-shed. Related names include Byers, Byres, Byer, Buyers and Byris.

People with this surname
 Andrew Bayer (born 1987), American DJ and record producer
 Bryce Bayer (1929–2012), American scientist
 Carl Josef Bayer (1847–1904), Austrian chemist
 Edward A. Bayer (born 1947), American-Israeli scientist
 Frederick Bayer (1921–2007), American marine biologist
 Friderika Bayer (born 1971), Hungarian singer
 Friedrich Bayer (1825–1880), German businessman and chemist, founder of what is now the German multinational pharmaceutical and biotechnology company Bayer
 George Bayer (1800-1839), German music teacher and American pioneer
 Herbert Bayer (1900–1985), Austrian graphic designer, painter, and photographer
 Johann Bayer (1572–1625), German astronomer
 Josef Bayer (1852–1913), Austrian composer
 Margaret Bayer, American mathematician
 Melda Bayer (born 1950), Turkish businesswoman and politician
 Osvaldo Bayer (1927–2018), Argentine journalist and scriptwriter
 Otto Bayer (1902–1982), German inventor and chemist
 Pilar Bayer (born 1946), Spanish mathematician
 Samuel Bayer (born 1965), American film director
 Svend Bayer (born 1946), Danish-British potter
 Theodore Bayer, American newspaper publisher and alleged spy
 Vanessa Bayer (born 1981), American actress and comedian
 William Bayer (born 1939), American author
 Zsolt Bayer (born 1963), Hungarian far-right journalist

References

See also
Beyer
Bayer (disambiguation)
Bajer (disambiguation)

English-language surnames
German-language surnames
German toponymic surnames
Ethnonymic surnames